Thomsonieae is a tribe of plants in the arum family.

Taxonomy 
Thomsonieae is now monotypic, having originally contained two genera: 

 Amorphophallus Blume ex Decne. synonym: Pseudodracontium N. E. Br.

References

External links 
 

Monocot tribes